Olof Samuel Tempelman (February 21, 1745 in Källstad, Östergötland – July 27, 1816 in Stockholm) was a Swedish architect and, from 1779, professor at the Royal Swedish Academy of Arts. He was appointed royal architect in 1799.

Early life
He was the son of Samuel Tempelman (1711-1748), curate of Herrestad, and his wife Susanna Maria Ridderström (1718-1753). According to tradition, the name was derived from the Templars. The family had immigrated from Dorpat in Estonia, and had for generations lived in Östergötland. Susanna was the daughter of a captain and grew up in Östergötland. When Tempelman was three years old, his father died. He was cared for by his father's older brother, Peter Tempelman, who served as priest in the Östra Stenby congregation. His uncle was a man of scientific interest, who collected books and had contact with the Royal Swedish Academy of Sciences. Tempelman had a happy childhood and showed an early interest in design. His received his early education at home and continued studying, along with his cousin, at the high school in Linköping.

At Uppsala University in 1763, he began studying theology and the humanities while working as a tutor for income. But he eventually immersed himself in science, following in the likes of Carl Linnaeus, Anders Celsius, and Samuel Klingenstierna. Tempelman wrote a thesis in astronomy under Daniel Melanderhjelm before starting on a master's thesis in physics, De frictione corporum super plano horizontale motorum.

Career
Carl Fredrik Adelcrantz succeeded Carl Johan Cronstedt as Superintendent of Antiquities in 1767, and two years later, he hired Tempelman. Adelcrantz hired Tempelman for his insight and skill, and took a personal interest in his development. While Tempelman wrote his master's thesis, he began work as an architect at the Superintendent's office. The thesis was elegantly illustrated and dedicated to Adelcrantz. He also continued to tutor and met the city architect Carl Henric König, one of the era's most skilled and high-profile architects as well as technically literate; he created drawings and descriptions for the inventor Christopher Polhem. This was the area that interested Tempelman.

In the spring of 1775, Adelcrantz sent Tempelman on a study trip to Copenhagen. In October 1776, Gustav III assigned Tempelman to be an information aide for fortifications; he trained under Fredrik Dederichs who taught prospective officers and architects since the 1750s, including Erik Palmstedt.  Tempelman came to be involved in Gustav III's new opera house at Norrmalmstorg. It was a complex project and Adelcrantz appointed Tempelman to be responsible for project implementation. Tempelman designed Gustav III's Pavilion in with detailed instructions from the king. Many of Tempelman projects related to churches but there were also other public buildings. In addition, he undertook private commissions. Adelcrantz often made the first sketches, but the two men worked closely together.

Adelcrantz urged Tempelman to become a professor. In 1780, he was appointed professor at the Royal Swedish Academy of Arts. Tempelman traveled to Paris and Rome. He visited Naples with Carl August Ehrensvärd and they also made a trip to Pompeii and Vesuvius, returning home via Venice, Milan, Genoa, Antibes, Marseille, and Paris. The 1780s were a successful period of increasingly independent tasks, and, with international experience, he developed a more independent design. The 1790s were a politically unsettled time in Sweden. In July 1798, Tempelman complained that sight in one of his eyes was deteriorating. The office of the Superintendent of Antiquities, however, was still busy designing churches, schools, and hospitals, especially outside Stockholm, and this is where Tempelman gave significant effort. After suffering two serious illnesses within a year, his physical and emotional health deteriorated. He did not give up work entirely, continuing for several years at the office of the Superintendent of Antiquities, and also teaching at the academy.

Personal life
Through his connections with Adelcrantz, Tempelman met Britta Elisabet Gyllenstam, daughter of Colonel Jonas Zacharias Gyllenstam and Catharina Elisabeth von Numers. They married in 1782. In the following year, they had a daughter, Mary Catherine, who died as an infant; his wife died a year later. Tempelman secondly married Dorothea Catherina Pagenkopff, the daughter of the German shoemaker Michael C. Pagenkopff, in 1804. They had five children, two boys who died early, and three girls. Tempelman died on 27 July 1816, and was buried in Stockholm, leaving behind his wife and three daughters.

Partial list of works

 Old Town, Stockholm, castle environment, 1774
 Royal Palace, rearranging the rooms & floors, 1774
 Tranemo church, Västergötland, 1774, not done, 1600 Century church in the 1880s, replaced by new hexagonal church building was designed by architect Emil Victor Langlet
 Ulriksdal, Uppland, north wing of the building's attic, 1774
 Västerås gymnasium, Västmanland, restructuring proposals for Senate, 1774
 Hycklinge Church, Ostrogothia, 1775, Per Wilhelm Palm Roth prepares new draft 1792
 Göta Court of Appeal, Jonkoping, 1775
 Valbo church, Gästrikland, tower and vestry, 1775, the tower was built in 1775
 Nora Church, Västmanland, 1776, not performed, a new church built in the 1880s
 Selångers church, Medelpad, 1776, erected in 1780-1781
 Sollerö church, Dalarna, 1776
 Sofia Magdalena Church, Askersund, school and almshouses, 1777
 Björsäters church, Västergötland, 1777
 Helsingborg, Corps-de-garde, 1777, building guards and jail completed in 1778, demolished 1882
 Core Church, West Yorkshire, organ facade in 1777, destroyed by fire in 1893
 Nässjö old church, Småland, 1777, erected in 1789-1791
 Hornstull, city sports and customs houses, Stockholm, 1777, the archway demolished in 1905, customs houses demolished in 1933
 Skeppsholmen, magazines, Stockholm, 1777 & 1779, rebuilt, now part of the Academy of Fine Arts
 Tuna church, Medelpad, tower and nave, 1777, long house with a gable roof was built from 1776 to 1778, the tower was built until 1937
 Uppsala Cathedral, Sture chancel, wrought iron grilles, 1777
 Western Torups Church, Zealand, organ facade, 1777
 Årstads courthouse, Halland, 1777, torn, probably 1973
 Ödeshögs Church, West Yorkshire, 1777, rebuilt in the 1880s
 Örkened Church, Zealand, 1777, erected in 1786-1788
 Alvesta church, Småland, organ façade, 1778, built as proposed by Pehr Schiörlin
 Stora Kopparberg church, Falun, tower and altar set-up, 1778, the tower built in 1780, transformative 1900, altar setup exchanged 1900
 Kil's Church, wa, towers, 1778, was built in 1779-1780
 Kläckeberga church, Smaland, altarpiece installation, 1778, not done
 Linkoping, Stångebro, stone bridge, 1778, erected in 1779-1780, demolished for the construction of the Kinda Canal, new bridge for drawing 1870
 Replots church, Ostrobothnia, Finland, 1778, erected in 1781, however, without a tower
 Sollerö church, Dalarna, pulpit, 1778
 Säters church, Dalarna, 1778, begun in 1780
 Silvii school, Tun, Västergötland, 1778, built from 1780 to 1781, restored 1965
 Värnamo church, Småland, organ façade, 1778, the organ was built in 1778, the church torn in the 1870s
 Värö church, Halland, organ façade, 1778, the organ was demolished along with the church in 1855
 Västerås dean farm, 1778, completed in 1780, a historic building in 1981
 Fridlevstads church, Blekinge, towers, 1779, not performed
 Hultsjö church, Småland, 1779, not done, plans for a new church of hoof-and city architect Per Axel Nyström 1859
 Korsholm, Toby Bridge, Ostrobothnia, Finland, 1779, built in 1781, antiquarian protected 1982
 Kättilstads Church, West Yorkshire, organ facade, 1779, revision of the proposal by Pehr Schiörlin, performed after the proposal
 Gustaf Church, Lulea, SWE, 1779, conducted from 1787 to 1790, destroyed by fire in 1887
 Rystads Church, West Yorkshire, in 1779, built in 1780-1783
 Långholmen, Spinnhusbron, Stockholm, 1779, demolished
 Tavastkyro church, Häme, Finland, 1779, erected in 1780-1782, first tower 1880
 Bettna church, Södermanland, & chapel, 1780, unexecuted
 Heinola residence, Häme, Finland, 1780, not built
 Helgeandsholmen, Count Per's house and Lower Royal. Stallgården, Stockholm, 1780, executed around 1780, demolished 1893
 Drottningholm, Ståthållarbostad & stables, Upland, 1781, completed in 1787 as a residence
 North 's control, Stockholm, incl. plans to create a place for artists, sculptor and professor Johan Tobias Sergel konungastod, 1781
 Börringe Church, Zealand, 1782, erected in 1783-1787, carnitine curved hood replaced by a pyramid-shaped in the 1870s
 Drottningholm, the dukes' stables, Upland, 1782, converted into senior citizen housing in 1985, a historic building in 1987
 Rystads Church, West Yorkshire, organ facade, 1782
 Slack's Church, West Yorkshire, altar setup & organ facade, 1782
 Vårdö church, Aland, Finland, 1782, the church later expanded during the 1780s, the tower was built in 1805
 Turku Hospital, Finland Proper, 1782, built 1783-1784, demolished 1880
 Arbrå church, Hälsingland, pulpit, 1783
 Enåsa church and chapel, Västergötland, 1783
 Hedensö manor, Södermanland, wing, 1783
 Hökhuvuds Church, Upland, organ facade, 1783, organ building of Olof Schwan 1783, new organ works behind the old organ, 1936
 St John's Church, Stockholm, 1783, not done
 Skeppsholmen, Kungl. woodyard, Stockholm, 1783
 Coins Hall, Stockholm, 1783
 Ulriksdal, Upland, Confidence, 1783
 Vissefjärda church, Småland, organ façade, 1783, organ building of Pehr Schiörlin 1784, replaced in 1883 by organ from Kalmar Cathedral
 Consulates & post office, Helsingor, Denmark, 1784, was built in 1791
 Härnösands county, Tennessee, 1784
 St. Peter's Church, Malmo, stands & organ facade, 1784
 Siuntio Church, Nyland, organ façade, Finland, 1784, facade was built as drawn, organ replacement work
 Söraby church, Småland, bleachers & organ façade, 1784, organ building of Pehr Schiörlin 1785, only the facade preserved
 Al's church, Dalarna, pulpit, 1784, conducted from 1785 to 1787
 Eastern Eds church, Smaland, altarpiece installation, 1784, carried out, but only altarpiece rescued by fire in 1958
 Drottningholm, residential, Upland, 1785, not performed
 Drottningholm castle stables, Upland, 1785, not performed
 Drottningholm, ståthållarkansliet, Upland, 1785, was introduced in 1787
 Gothenburg's Hospital, 1785, demolished 1963
 Härnösand Gymnasium, Tennessee, 1785, monument 1982
 Härnösand Hospital, Tennessee, 1785, ready 1788, a historic building in 1967
 Jonsbergs Manor, West Yorkshire, Manor House, 1785, erected in 1791, a historic building in 1980
 Vänersborgs church, Västergötland, 1785, only the facade preserved
 Österåkers church, Södermanland, 1785
 Dädesjö church, Småland, 1786, completed 1794
 Haga, Upland, farm buildings, 1786, executed about 1786
 Haga Castle, Uppland, 1786
 Vähäkyrö church, Ostrobothnia, Finland, 1786, built in 1803
 Church of Hämeenlinna, Häme, Finland, 1786, completed 1798
 Uppsala University, auditoriums, 1786
 Ölme church, Värmland, built in 1787-1788
 Drottningholm Castle, Upland, bridges in the English Park, 1787
 Haga, Upland, Corps-de-garde, building guard 1787
 Haga, Upland, Gustav III 's Pavilion, 1787
 Collegium medicum, Stockholm, 1787, probably carried
 We Southern church, Småland, organ façade, 1787, the organ built by Per Schiörlin 1788
 Uppsala University, Botanicum, 1787
 S Church, Småland, 1788, was built 1830-1831 after a proposal by Per Axel Nyström 1828
 Bodsjö church, Jamtland, 1788
 Rinna's Church, West Yorkshire, in 1788, built in 1799-1802
 Sollerö church, Dalarna, altar set-up, 1788
 Western Karaby Church, Zealand, towers, 1788, not done, the tower was built in 1794 after another proposal, a new longhouse from drawings by architect Axel Almfelt 1822-1826
 Växjö Bishop farm (Östrabo), Småland, 1788
 Hohenwarth, farmhouse, Pomerania, Germany, 1789, demolished 1856
 Crow Hults church, Småland, 1789, erected in 1801-1802
 Forsmark church and chapel, Upland, 1790, erected in 1796-1802
 Gothenburg hospital, a granary and brewery, 1790
 Hällekis manor, Västergötland, farmhouse & barn, 1790, extension was built around 1790
 Härkeberga Church, Upland, pulpit, 1790
 Kvidinge Church, Zealand, towers, 1790
 Linköping City Hall, West Yorkshire, 1790, not performed
 Gustaf Church, Lulea, altar setup, 1790, carried out but the church destroyed by fire
 The church, Southwest Finland, 1790, organ building of Olof Schwan 1791
 Norsborgs manor, pavilion, 1790,
 Sundby church, Södermanland, 1790
 Vasteras Cathedral, Västmanland, epitaph, 1790
 Christinae church, Alingsås, stands & organ facade, 1791
 Härnösand Gymnasium, Tennessee, lectern, 1791
 Falsterbo Light, Skåne, in 1792, built in 1793-1796, upper demolished 1842-1843, monument 1935
 Färingtofta Church, Zealand, 1792
 Trinity Church, Karlskrona, 1792, north portico finished first in 1862 after the Temple's proposal
 Lindberg's Church, Halland, 1792, not done
 Linköping Cathedral, tomb, 1792
 Notte Appliances church, Småland, 1792, new church was built first in the 1830s after the drawing of the master mason John Abraham Wilelius
 Ulrika Eleonora Church in Stockholm, front steps, 1792
 Royal Palace in Stockholm, King Gustav IV Adolf floor, 1792
 Tuna church, Småland, organ facade, 1792, at the rebuilding in the 1890s were preserved only Pehr Schiörlins organ works from 1795
 Varberg's Church, Halland, 1792, the organ facade preserved but rebuilt and with sparser ornamentation
 Fors Room Church, Smaland, altarpiece installation, 1793
 Kuopio county, Savo, Finland, 1793, unexecuted
 Ljung's Church, West Yorkshire, in 1793, built in 1796-1798
 Church of Sund, Östergötland, altar setup & pulpit, 1793
 Heinola hospital, Häme, Finland, 1794, was built in 1797-1799, now demolished
 Jönköping Hospital, 1794, the hospital ended 1825
 Karlskrona hospital, 1794
 Nyköping Hospital, Saint Anne's Hospital in 1794, completed 1799
 Nässjö old church, Småland, organ façade, 1794, processing of Pehr Schiörlins facade drawing from 1794
 Vårdnäs Church, West Yorkshire, in 1794, long houses built from 1795 to 1797
 Växjö Hospital, Småland, 1794, not performed
 Växjö residence, Småland, wind decor & Fence, 1794
 Grime's church, Halland, 1795, carried out, the tower, however, first during the 1900s
 Holm's church, Medelpad, 1795, demolished in 1903, new construction in the Gothic Revival
 King church of Sund, Östergötland, 1795
 Rosersberg, Upland, 1795
 Lind Hov Royal Farm, Halland, farmhouse & wings, 1796, grand pianos built in 1896, first farmhouse 1838
 Lunda church, Södermanland, pulpit, 1796
 Stockholm Observatory, 1796
 Vreta Abbey Church, Östergötland, gravestone, 1796
 But are Church, Upland, 1797, built 1797-1806
 Stora Tuna Church, Dalarna, organ façade, 1797, organ building in 1800, fire damage, 1807, new organ, 1969
 Oulu Hospital, Ostrobothnia, Finland, 1797, not performed
 Västerås Hospital, Västmanland, 1797, the buildings demolished in the 1880s
 Dädesjö church, Småland, bleachers, 1798
 Gryts church, Södermanland, stands & organ façade, 1798, unexecuted
 Linköping gymnasium, 1799, new trivial school built in 1828-1830
 Kälviä church, Ostrobothnia, Finland, bell tower and parish magazine, 1799, was built in 1803-1804
 Vaxholm Church, Upland, 1799, the church consecrated in 1803, the tower is not built
 Eastern Husby Church, West Yorkshire, 1799
 Karstula chapel church, Ostrobothnia, Finland, 1800
 Stockholm Smedjegård custody, 1800
 Strängnäs Cathedral, Södermanland, organ facade, 1800
 Tubbetorps property, Västergötland, farmhouse, 1800, probably done around 1800, new residential building built in 1803-1804
 Sleeping Valla's Church, West Yorkshire, 1800, not performed, built and designed by Samuel Enander 1816
 Matteröds Church, Zealand, 1802, new tower 1897-1898
 Brännkyrka Church, Stockholm, 1802
 Vreta Abbey Church, Östergötland, tomb, 1802, not done
 Fittja bridge, SWE, 1803, built 1813, torn at the beginning of the 1900s
 Kalmar gymnasium, Småland, 1803
 Leppävirta Church, Savo, Finland, in 1803, erected, but burned in 1834, the new church after the drawing of the architect Carl Ludvig Engel 1846
 Rolf's church, Halland, 1803, revised in 1816 by conductor and Lieutenant Pehr Wilhelm Palmroth, towers erected in the 1920s
 Skedevi Church, Missouri, 1803, transept my windows bricked up during the 1900s
 Bötoms church, Ostrobothnia, 1804, erected in 1808-1811
 Jämshög church, Blekinge, 1804, erected in 1804-1833
 Vaxholm Church, Upland, organ facade, 1804
 Pori School, Vaasa, Finland, 1804, the outbreak of war interrupted the building, burned again in the great fire of 1852
 Hammar Lunda Church, Zealand, stands & organ façade, 1805, executed in a somewhat simplified condition of the organ is only the facade preserved
 Herrevadskloster, Scania, demesne, 1805, not performed
 Frederick Church, Karlskrona, Blekinge, tornhuvar, 1805, not performed
 Norrtälje church, Upland, Altar, 1805
 Säters church, Dalarna, towers, 1805, the tower damaged by fire in 1803, after a new drawing of Tempelman repaired 1806
 Vaksala Church, Upland, stands & organ façade, 1805, Organ building after drawing of Olof Schwan, facade and some original parts preserved
 Bjorn Borg's town hall, Vaasa, Finland, 1806, started in 1807, after the war broke new drawings in 1839, destroyed in the fire of 1852
 District Hammar's Church, West Yorkshire, altar set-up, 1806
 Karbennings Church, Västmanland, 1806, not done, a new church in 1845
 Kristdala church, Småland, bleachers & organ facade, 1806
 Marstrand's Church, Bohuslän, bleachers & organ façade, 1806, not performed
 Säters church, Dalarna, altar pulpit, 1806
 S Church, Jamtland, organ facade, 1807
 Erajärvi chapel church, Häme?, Finland, 1807, built in 1821
 Fagerhults church, Småland, gallery, 1807, probably made, the church torn in the 1890s
 Gothenburg Cathedral, tomb, 1807
 Harlösa Church, Zealand, stands & organ façade, 1807, carried out, replaced with new organ
 Härnösand Gymnasium, Tennessee, entrance gate, 1807, fences & gates, erected in 1810
 Sala Church, Västmanland, towers, 1807, none of the proposals made
 Stockholm, Nytorget, Skånegatan 83, residential, 1807, demolished 1930
 Västra Husby Church, West Yorkshire, 1807, erected after a simplified drawing of Axel Almfelt 1816, burned 1977, rebuilt
 Oved's Church, Zealand, stands & organ facade, 1807
 Crow Hults church, Småland, organ façade, 1808, processing of Pehr Schiörlins proposal in 1807, organ construction with simplified facade of Schiörlin 1810-1811
 Norrsunda Church, Upland, organ facade, 1808, executed, new organ built in 1963
 Eastern Husby Church, West Yorkshire, pulpit, 1808
 Botkyrka church, Södermanland, bleachers & organ facade, 1810
 Säters church, Dalarna, bleachers & organ facade, 1811
 Vadstena school, West Yorkshire, 1811, medieval schoolhouse torn down in 1810, a new schoolhouse for other drawings, built first in 1831
 Caroli cemetery, Borås, Västergötland, 1812
 Hörups Church, Zealand, organ facade, undated, probably not done
 Sjöö Castle, Uppland, the measurement of Tessin the Elder terrace & stairs, undated

References

 Villner, L. B. (1997). Tempelman: Arkitekten Olof Tempelman 1745-1816. Stockh: Stockholmia förlag. , ISSN 0282-5899
 "The architecture in the late Gustavian stage", in George Nordensvan's, Swedish Art and Swedish artists in the nineteenth century (1925), I. From Gustav III to Charles XV

External links

 "Tempelman, Olof Samuel", in Profil (2nd edition, 1919)
 "Chancellery, Stockholm", in Profil (second print, Supplement, 1924)

1745 births
1816 deaths
People from Östergötland County
Swedish architects
Members of the Royal Swedish Academy of Arts